The year 2009 saw many sequels and prequels in video games. New intellectual properties include Batman: Arkham Asylum, Bayonetta, Borderlands, Demon's Souls, Dragon Age: Origins, Infamous, Just Dance, Minecraft, and Prototype.

Best-selling games
The following are the top ten best-selling games of 2009 in terms of worldwide retail sales.

Events

Console releases
The list of game consoles released in 2009 in North America.

Game releases

List of games released in 2009 in North America.

Critically acclaimed titles
Metacritic (MC) and GameRankings (GR) are aggregators of video game journalism reviews.

See also
2009 in games

Notes

References

 
Video games by year